"Cómo No" is a song by Senegalese American singer Akon, featuring American singer Becky G. It was released by Akonik Label Group on September 6, 2019. It is the lead single from Akon's fourth studio album and Latin debut album El Negreeto.

Release
The song was released to digital platforms and streaming services on September 6, 2019.

Music video
The song's accompanying music video premiered on September 6, 2019. The music video was broadcast on MTVU, MTV Live and in Time Square.

Live performances
The song was performed live for the first time at the 2019 MTV Europe Music Awards.

Personnel
Credits adopted from Tidal

 Camilo Echeverry – production
 John Leone – engineering, production
 Colin Leonard – engineering
 Josh Woods – engineering
 Maffio – production
 Matthew Weiss – engineering
 Mauricio Montaner – production
 Ricky Montaner – production

Charts

References

2019 singles
2019 songs
Akon songs
Becky G songs
Songs written by Akon
Spanish-language songs
Songs written by Camilo (singer)